Regional Theatre of the Palouse (RTOP) is an established non-profit theater company based in Pullman, Washington. It was founded in 2007 by award-winning Managing Artistic Director John Rich. Its mission statement explains its goal: "make a positive difference in the Palouse region by providing an outlet for creative expression through theater arts". RTOP provides theatrical entertainment in the form of play, musicals, and theater workshops. Productions occur primarily in the RTOP Theatre. Past performances have been held at Beasley Performing Arts Coliseum and venues across the Palouse.

History

Regional Theatre of the Palouse divides the presentations with seasons most of them were sold out, during the year 2015 the first show of the year was “Little Shop of Horrors”, that show like the others was sold out between February 19th to March 1st the time that the show was on available to see, during the year 2015, the theatre had productions like “Mary Poppins”, “The Wizard of Oz”, “Venus in Fur”, “Sweeny Todd” and finish with “Holiday Memories” during all December. ¡In 2016, the theater started with the production of the “I Do! I Do!” on February and finish with “Adams Family”, but at the beginning of that year the theater could establish and develop a Summer Teen Workshop, but also a short time later the Theater open workshops for Teen and Senior and opened free admissions for seniors of the community for that reason the productions staff had an increase in the number of teens and senior. The rest of the productions as usually were sold out and gave standing ovations. The year 2017 was really important with a lot of changes in the theater, new productions starting with “A Funny Things Happened on the way to the Forum” and finishing the year with the musical “A Christmas story”, but also the theater created new programs and more sold out productions also the costume and marketing internship program was added to the theater, the summer teen workshop stated to be guided by senior professionals, and for the half of the year the half of the performances included senior patrons. The year of 2018 was a year of growth, change, new programs and productions. RTOP ended the 2018 season with a traditional music theater standard Fiddler on the roof. The season started in June with summer camp workshops and educational programs that continue to grow. RTOP increased management talent through the ongoing internship program, currently offering internships in costume, marketing, and event planning. Continued with the 39 steps as our After Dark series followed by Disney’s Newsies in November. Auditions were held in November for two shows of the season, Cabaret and Mamma Mia! It continues to grow in hopes of keeping the performing arts alive and thriving on the Palouse. The year of 2019 opened up with Cabaret followed up by the adored movie musical Mamma Mia! This was a year of growth, and stellar productions! ¡Regional Theatre of the Palouse ended the 2019 season with the dance party musical Mamma Mia! The theater camps were a joy and reached their maximum capacity this year. For the theater, 2020 began with high hopes. The theater opened the season with the delightful award-winning Broadway musical, She Loves Me, which boasted a successful pairing of professional and regional talent. The theater were so looking forward to their season finale, Thoroughly Modern Millie, which included another star-studded cast, when it was stopped in its tracks by COVID-19. RTOP had to pivot, in order for the theatre to forge ahead. And that they did!  With the help provided by charitable giving, grant sourcing, and grassroots fundraising, they were able to keep their stage lights burning brightly and to further their mission, which is to promote the arts and art education through quality theatre. Technology enabled them to present their summer camps via recorded video. The theater did the same with their seasonal performance workshops. A gift to RTOP will have immediate and visible impact here, where they live, for you and others like Colton. Your gift will keep ticket prices at a minimum, help expand their donor-funded scholarship program, and further bring high-quality professional productions to their area which otherwise would go without. Donors are recognized by name on their website, in each show program, and may choose how their gifts will be used – for costumes, lighting, props, education, or any other area of need. With your help they look forward to a bright season at RTOP! The Regional Theater of the Palouse hope you will make a contribution today, so that the shows may go on. To give, please use the enclosed donation form or call 509.334.0750. Thank you for your support, they couldn’t do it without you!.

RTOP Productions 

Beasley Performing Arts Coliseum
The Wizard of Oz by L. Frank Baum; Director: John Rich, musical director: Tina McClure (August 2007)
Fiddler on the Roof by Jerry Bock; Director: John Rich, musical director: Tina McClure (September 2008)
Annie get your Gun by Irving Berlin; Director: John Rich, musical director: Tina McClure (September 2009)

RTOP Theatre
Seussical the Musical by Lynn Ahrens, Stephen Flaherty; Director: John Rich, musical director: Tina McClure (April, 2008)
I remember Mama by Thomas Meehan; Director: John Rich, musical director: Tina McClure (December 2008)
Cabaret by Joe Masteroff; Director: John Rich, musical director: Kelly Barnum (March 2009)
The Trouble with Angels by Jane Trahey; Director: Joseph Monohon (May 2009)
Willy Wonka by Roald Dahl; Director: John Rich (November 2009)
Enchanted April by Peter Barnes; Director: AnnaSophia Villeanueva
Guys and Dolls by Jo Swerling and Abe Burrows; Director: John Rich, musical director: Tina McClure
Gypsy: A Musical Fable by Jule Styne and Stephen Sondheim; Director: Joseph Monohon, musical director: Tina McClure
White Christmas by Irving Berlin; Director: John Rich, musical director: Tina McClure
The Diary of Anne Frank by Frances Goodrich and Albert Hackett; Director: John Rich
	
2011-12 Season

Annie by James Whitcomb Riley Music Charles Strouse Lyrics Martin Charnin
Meet Me in St. Louis by Vincente Minnelli
The Odd Couple by Neil Simon
The Secret Garden by Frances Hodgson Burnett

2012-13 Season

Oliver! (The Musical) by Lionel Bart Music and Lyrics Lionel Bart
How to Succeed in Business Without Really Trying by Frank Loesser Music and Lyrics Frank Loesser
Cat on a Hot Tin Roof by Tennessee Williams
Hello Dolly! by Michael Stewart Music and Lyrics Jerry Herman

2013-14 Season

The Sound of Music by Howard Lindsay and Russel Crouse Music Richard Rodgers Lyrics Oscar Hammerstein II
Grease by Jim Jacobs and Warren Casey Music and Lyrics Jim Jacobs and Warren Casey
Madeline's Christmas by Ludwig Bemelmans
Barefoot in the Park by Neil Simon
Les Miserables by Victor Hugo

2014-15 Season

The Music Man by Meredith Willson and Franklin Lacey Music and Lyrics Meredith Willson
Oklahoma! by Oscar Hammerstein II Music Richard Rodgers Lyrics 	Oscar Hammerstein II
Little Shop of Horrors by Howard Ashman Music Alan Menken Lyrics Howard Ashman
Mary Poppins by P. L. Travers Music and Lyrics Richard M. Sherman and Robert B. Sherman

2015-16 Season

The Wizard of Oz by L. Frank Baum
Venus in Fur by David Ives
Sweeney Todd
Holiday Memories
I Do! I Do! by Tom Jones Music Harvey Schmidt Lyrics Tom Jones
The Last 5 Years by Jason Robert Brown Music and Lyrics Jason Robert Brown
Anything Goes by Guy Bolton Music and Lyrics 	Cole Porter
Tuesdays With Morrie by Mitch Albom

2016-17 Season

13 (musical) Music and Lyrics by Jason Robert Brown
You're A Good Man Charlie Brown Music and Lyrics by Clark Gesner
Rabbit Hole written by David Lindsay Abaire
The Addams Family created by Charles Addams
A Funny Thing Happened On the Way to the Forum Music and Lyrics by Stephen Sondheim
Sister Act Directed by Emile Ardolino written by Paul Rudnick musical by Marc Shaiman
The Birds APR 2017 written by Aristophanes

2017-18 Season

All Shook Up recorded by Elvis Presley composed by Otis Blackwell
The Miracle Worker written by William Gibson
A Christmas Story: The Musical Music and Lyrics by Pasek and Paul
Legally Blonde directed by Robert Luketic written by Karen McCullah Lutz and Kirsten Smith
Fiddler on the Roof Music by Jerry Bock Lyrics by Joseph Stein
God of Carnage by Yasmina Reza

2018-19 Season
The King and I  by Rodgers and Hammerstein Music  Richard Rodgers Lyrics Oscar Hammerstein II
The 39 Steps by John Buchan written by Patrick Barlow
Newsies Diredted by Kenny Ortega written by Bob Tzudiker and Noni White
Cabaret
Mamma Mia! Music and lyrics by Benny Andersson and Bjorn Ulvaeus
Stardust Memories

2019-20 Season

Funny Girl by Isobel Lennart Music Jule Styne Lyrics  Bob Merrill
Same Time, Next Year by Bernard Slade
Matilda Music and Lyrics by Tim Minchin
She Loves Me by Joe Masteroff Music Jerry Bock Lyrics Sheldon Harnick

2020-21 Season

Canceled due to COVID-19

2021-22 Season

Sunset Boulevard
Company
Pippin
Jerry Herman's Showtune Review

Musical Reviews
Oktoberfest by Nancy Downen Wexler; Director: John Rich (October 2007)

RTOP Production Stages

Beasley Performing Arts Coliseum 
Previously known as Friel Court, the Beasley Coliseum opened in 1973 in Pullman, Washington. It is a multi-purpose facility on the Washington State University campus. It holds as many as 12,500 people in total, although the seating only allows up to 2,500 during RTOP productions.

RTOP Theatre
The RTOP Theatre located in the historical downtown district of Pullman, was remodeled in 2007 from a 1920s storefront brick building converting a retail space into a 75-seat venue.

References

External links
Regional Theatre of the Palouse official web site
Regional Theatre of the Palouse on MySpace
RTOP article in The Argonaut
RTOP article in The Daily Evergreen

Theatre companies in Washington (state)
Community theatre
Pullman, Washington
Tourist attractions in Whitman County, Washington
2007 establishments in Washington (state)